Panca is a genus of skipper butterflies in the family Hesperiidae.

Species
Recognised species in the genus Panca include:
 Panca moseri Dolibaina, Carneiro & O.Mielke
 Panca subpunctuli (Hayward, 1934)

References

Natural History Museum Lepidoptera genus database

Hesperiinae
Hesperiidae genera